The Rondo in C for Violin and Orchestra, K. 373, was composed by Wolfgang Amadeus Mozart in April 1781. The rondo was likely written for Italian violinist Antonio Brunetti, who is known to have also requested both the Adagio in E and Rondo in B. The Rondo in C, however, was written years after the five numbered violin concertos. The work is scored for solo violin, two oboes, two horns and strings.

Analysis
The Rondo is marked Allegretto grazioso, and a performance typically lasts about 6 minutes.

External links

Violin concertos by Wolfgang Amadeus Mozart
Compositions in C major
1781 compositions